Spacing may refer to:
 Spacing (magazine), a Canadian magazine
 Spacing effect in psychology; the opposite of cramming
 The usage of spaces in typography
 Letter spacing, the amount of space between a group of letters
 Line spacing or leading, the amount of added vertical spacing between lines of type
 Sentence spacing, the horizontal space between sentences in typeset text
 French spacing, one convention for the use of spaces in printed text around punctuation, words, and sentences
 Spacing, a science fiction term for a theoretical method of execution by space exposure
 Spacing, the distance between microphones in an AB microphone system (see time-of-arrival stereophony)

See also
 Space (disambiguation)
 Spacer (disambiguation)

 Spaced, a British television series